In chemistry, pentacyanocobaltate is the coordination complex with the formula .  When crystallized with a quaternary ammonium cation, it can be obtained as a yellow solid. Pentacyanocobaltate attracted attention as an early example of a metal complex that reacts with hydrogen.  It contains low-spin cobalt(II), with a doublet ground state.

Synthesis and structure
Aqueous solutions of pentacyanocobaltate are produced by the addition of five or more equivalents of a cyanide salt to a solution of a cobalt(II) salt.  Initially this reaction produces insoluble cobalt dicyanide, but this solid dissolves in the presence of the excess cyanide.  Pentacyanocobaltate forms within seconds.  When prepared using a quaternary ammonium (quat) cyanide, crystals can be obtained with the formula .  According to X-ray crystallography, the salt features square pyamidal .

Reactions
Solutions of   undergo a variety of reactions. The complex attracted attention in the 1940s for its reactivity toward hydrogen, which is now understood to produce a cobalt hydride: 

When allowed to stand as a dilute solution for several minutes, the complex reacts with water to give two Co(III) derivatives:

In concentrated solution, the complex dimerizes:

With benzyl chloride and related alkylating agents, Co(III) alkyls are formed:

References

Cyano complexes
Cobalt compounds
Anions
Cobalt complexes
Cyanometallates